Cracked Nuts is a 1941 American comedy film directed by Edward F. Cline and written by Erna Lazarus and Scott Darling. The film stars Stuart Erwin, Una Merkel, Mischa Auer, William Frawley, Shemp Howard and Astrid Allwyn. It was released on August 1, 1941, by Universal Pictures. The film is unrelated Wheeler & Woolsey film of 1931 by the same title, although Cline directed both films.

Plot
Lawrence Trent is a small-town goofball who wins $5,000 in a radio contest. He plans to use the money to marry his sweetheart, but is instead conned into investing it in a phony robot scheme by Boris Kabikoff, whose prototype is actually his partner in a robot suit. When he discovers that he has been swindled, Lawrence tries to recover his money.

Cast        
Stuart Erwin as Lawrence Trent
Una Merkel as Sharon Knight
Mischa Auer as Boris Kabikoff
William Frawley as James Mitchell
Shemp Howard as Eddie / Ivan
Astrid Allwyn as Ethel Mitchell
Ernie Stanton as Ivan the Robot
Mantan Moreland as Burgess
Hattie Noel as Chloe
Francis Pierlot as Mayor Wilfred Smun
Will Wright as Sylvanus Boogle
Emmett Vogan as Mr. McAneny
Tom Hanlon as Dixon
Pat O'Malley as Officer #1

References

External links
 

1941 films
1940s English-language films
American comedy films
1941 comedy films
Universal Pictures films
Films directed by Edward F. Cline
American black-and-white films
1940s American films